Petkim Spor Kulübü, more commonly known as Socar Spor is a Turkish professional basketball club based in İzmir which currently competes in the Turkish Basketball Super League (BSL). The team was founded by Petkim in 2013 and got promoted to the first division in 2020. Their home arena is Aliağa Belediyesi ENKA Spor Salonu with a capacity of 3,000 seats. The team is sponsored by SOCAR, an oil and gas company in Azerbaijan.

History
On 29 July 2020 Sigortam.Net İTÜ was removed from the Basketbol Süper Ligi due to financial issues. Instead of them, Petkim Spor were granted a place in the Turkish top-tier league.

Players

Current roster

Notable former players

 Ege Arar
 İlkan Karaman
 Cemal Nalga
 Bora Hun Paçun
 Ümit Sonkol
 Okben Ulubay
 Kenan Bajramović
 Kaloyan Ivanov
 Darko Planinić
 Šarūnas Vasiliauskas
 Gary Browne
 Daniel Hamilton
 Josh Selby
 Justin Wright-Foreman

References

External links 
 Petkim Spor, Official Website
 Eurobasket.com Page
 Facebook Page
 TBLStat.net Profile

Basketball teams in Turkey
Basketball teams established in 2013
SOCAR
Sports teams in İzmir